Treated and Released is the third studio solo album by Joe "Bean" Esposito, the lead singer for the Brooklyn Dreams. They scored a Billboard #  2  hit with "Heaven Knows", a duet with Donna Summer.

Solo Artist

Esposito had  earlier success as a solo vocalist on the Flashdance soundtrack with "Lady, Lady, Lady" and The Karate Kid soundtrack with "You're the Best". Esposito was lead vocalist for the group Brooklyn Dreams.

Track listing
"Power of Love"  (Kenny Gamble, Leon Huff, Joe Simon) - 3:27  
"One Track Mind"  (Joe Esposito, Bruce Sudano) - 4:36  
"Walkin in the Rain"  (Joe Esposito, Peter T. Miller, M. Parnell) - 4:26  
"Letting You Go"  (Joe Esposito) - 5:32  
"Dancing in the Moonlight"  (Sherman Kelly) - 4:05  
"Signify Love"  (Joe Esposito) - 4:18  
"Show Me the Way to Your Heart"  (Joe Esposito, Eddie Hokenson, Bruce Sudano) - 4:11 - duet with Teresa James
"Then You Can Tell Me Goodbye"  (John D. Loudermilk) - 3:20  
"Jolé Blon"  (Traditional) - 4:07 - duet with Nicolette Larson  
"Talkin' About My Baby"  (Curtis Mayfield) - 4:03

Personnel
Joe Esposito - vocals
Randy Mitchell, Jeff "Skunk" Baxter, Rico Maderiaga, Carl Carloff - guitar
Chuck Fiore, Sal Guglielmi, Ikeman - bass
John Herron, Ikeman, Carl Carloff - keyboards
Rick Shlosser, Peter Miller - drums
Danny Federici - glockenspiel on "Dancin in the Moonlight"; accordion on "Jolé Blon"
Chris Mostert - saxophone
Lee Thornberg, Darrell Leonard - trumpet
Nick Lane - trombone

References

External links

Blues albums by American artists
1996 albums